Branns Hamlet is a village in Saint John Parish, Antigua and Barbuda.

Demographics 
Branns Hamlet has two enumeration districts.

 34800 Branns Hamlet-North 
 34900 Branns Hamlet-South

Census Data (2011) 
Source:

Individual

Household

References 

Populated places in Antigua and Barbuda
Saint John Parish, Antigua and Barbuda